Qasabestan (also Romanized as Qaşabestān and Qaşbestān; also known as Ghasabtan, Kāsāhasan, Kasbasān, and Kāseh Ḩasan) is a village in Miyan Rud Rural District, Qolqol Rud District, Tuyserkan County, Hamadan Province, Iran. At the 2006 census, its population was 326, in 81 families.

References 

Populated places in Tuyserkan County